Antonio Maria Vassallo (c. 1620-1664/1673) was an Italian painter of the Baroque period, active mainly in Genoa, and painting mythologic scenes and still lifes.

His biography is poorly documented, and mainly depends on the Genoese biographer Raffaele Soprani (1674) as a source. He initially apprenticed with Vincenzo Malò (c. 1605-c. 1650), a Flemish artist who had studied with Teniers the Elder and Rubens. Vassallo appears to have been influenced by his fellow Genoese Sinibaldo Scorza and Giovanni Benedetto Castiglione.

He painted a St. Francis with Three female saints (1648) for the church of San Gerolamo in Quarto.<ref>St. Francis and three saints now in Palazzo Bianco, Genoa.</ref> Vassallo also painted a Martyrdom of Saint Marcello Mastrilli''' (1664) for the Convento di Carignano.
Vassallo also painted portraits, yet no portraits by Vassallo are known at present.

The closest follower of Vassallo's still-life style is Giovanni Agostino Cassana (c. 1658-1720).

External links

References
Artnet biography from Grove encyclopedia of Art

1620s births
1660s deaths
17th-century Italian painters
Italian male painters
Painters from Genoa
Italian Baroque painters
Italian still life painters